Schistura fascimaculata is a species of ray-finned fish in the most diverse genus of the stone loach family Nemacheilidae, the genus Schistura. It is found in Pakistan.

References 

F
Fish described in 1981
Taxa named by Teodor T. Nalbant